The Fox sisters were three sisters from Rochester, New York who played an important role in the creation of Spiritualism: Leah (April 8, 1813 – November 1, 1890), Margaretta (also called Maggie), (October 7, 1833 – March 8, 1893) and Catherine Fox (also called Kate) (March 27, 1837 – July 2, 1892). The two younger sisters used "rappings" to convince their older sister and others that they were communicating with spirits. Their older sister then took charge of them and managed their careers for some time. They all enjoyed success as mediums for many years. 

In 1888, Margaretta confessed that their rappings had been a hoax and publicly demonstrated their method. Margaretta attempted to recant her confession the next year, but their reputation was ruined and in less than five years they were all dead, with Margaretta and Kate dying in abject poverty. Despite their confession, the Spiritualism movement continued to grow in popularity.

Hydesville events 
In 1848, the two younger sisters – Catherine (Kate) (age 11) and Margaretta (Maggie) (age 14) – were living in a house in Hydesville, New York, with their parents John and Margaret, who were Methodists. Hydesville no longer exists but was a hamlet that was part of the township of Arcadia in Wayne County, New York, just outside Newark. The house had some reputation for being haunted, but it was not until late March that the family began to be frightened by unexplained sounds that at times sounded like knocking and at other times like the moving of furniture.

In 1888, Margaretta told her story of the origins of the mysterious "rappings":
"When we went to bed at night we used to tie an apple to a string and move the string up and down, causing the apple to bump on the floor, or we would drop the apple on the floor, making a strange noise every time it would rebound. Mother listened to this for a time. She would not understand it and did not suspect us as being capable of a trick because we were so young."

During the night of March 31, Kate challenged the invisible noisemaker, presumed to be a "spirit", to repeat the snaps of her fingers. "It" did. "It" was asked to rap out the ages of the girls. "It" did. The neighbors were called in. Over the course of the next few days a code was developed where raps could signify yes or no in response to a question or be used to indicate a letter of the alphabet.

The girls addressed the spirit as "Mr. Splitfoot" which is a nickname for the Devil. Later, the alleged "entity" creating the sounds claimed to be the spirit of a peddler named Charles B. Rosna, who had been murdered five years earlier and buried in the cellar. In his writings on the Fox sisters, Arthur Conan Doyle claimed the neighbors dug up the cellar and found a few pieces of bone. No missing person named Charles B. Rosna was ever identified.

Margaretta Fox, in her later years noted:

Emergence as mediums 

Kate and Margaretta were sent to nearby Rochester during the excitement – Kate to the house of her sister Leah (now the married Leah Fox Fish), and Margaretta to the home of her brother David – and the rappings followed them. Amy and Isaac Post, a radical Quaker couple and long-standing friends of the Fox family, invited the girls into their Rochester home. Immediately convinced of the genuineness of the phenomena, they helped to spread the word among their radical Quaker friends, who became the early core of Spiritualists. In this way appeared the association between Spiritualism and radical political causes, such as abolition, temperance, and equal rights for women.

On 14 November 1849, the Fox sisters demonstrated their spiritualist rapping at the  Corinthian Hall in Rochester. This was the first demonstration of spiritualism held before a paying public and inaugurated a long history of public events featured by spiritualist mediums and leaders in the United States and in other countries.

The Fox girls became famous and their public séances in New York in 1850 attracted notable people including William Cullen Bryant, George Bancroft, James Fenimore Cooper, Nathaniel Parker Willis, Horace Greeley, Sojourner Truth and William Lloyd Garrison. They also attracted imitators; during the following few years, hundreds of people claimed the ability to communicate with spirits.

Kate and Margaretta became well-known mediums, giving séances for hundreds of people. Many of these early séances were entirely frivolous, where sitters sought insight into "the state of railway stocks or the issue of love affairs," but the religious significance of communication with the deceased soon became apparent. Horace Greeley, the prominent publisher and politician, became a kind of protector for them, enabling their movement in higher social circles. But the lack of parental supervision was pernicious, as both of the young women began to drink wine.

Leah, on the death of her first husband, married a successful Wall Street banker. Margaretta met Elisha Kane, the Arctic explorer, in 1852. Kane was convinced that Margaretta and Kate were engaged in fraud, under the direction of their sister Leah, and he sought to break Margaretta from the group. Kane married Margaretta nonetheless, and she converted to the Roman Catholic faith. When Kane died in 1857, she returned to her activities as a medium. In 1876 she joined her sister Kate, who was living in England.

Evaluation

The cracking of joints was the theory scientists and skeptics most favored to explain the rappings, a theory dating back to 1850. The physician E. P. Longworthy investigated the sisters and noted how the knockings or raps always came from under their feet or when their dresses were in contact with the table. He concluded that Margaretta and Kate had produced the noises themselves. 

John W. Hurn who published articles in the New-York Tribune also came to a similar conclusion of fraud. The Reverend John M. Austin would later claim the noises could be made by cracking toe joints. The Reverend D. Potts demonstrated to an audience that the raps could be made by this method.

In 1851, Mrs. Norman Culver, a relative of the Fox family, admitted in a signed statement that she had assisted them during their séances by touching them to indicate when the raps should be made. She also claimed that Kate and Margaretta revealed to her the method of producing the raps by snapping their toes and using their knees and ankles.

In 1851, the Reverend C. Chauncey Burr wrote in the New-York Tribune that by cracking toe joints the sounds were so loud, they could be heard in a large hall. In the same year three investigators Austin Flint, Charles E. Lee and C.B. Coventry from the University at Buffalo examined the raps produced by the sisters and concluded they were produced by cracking their bone joints such as toes, knees, ankles or hips. From a control, they discovered the raps did not occur if the sisters were placed on a couch with cushions under their feet.

In 1853, Charles Grafton Page of Washington, D.C., investigated the Fox sisters. As a patent examiner and patent advocate, Page had developed a keen eye for detecting fraudulent claims about science. He applied these skills in exposing some of the deceptions employed by the Fox sisters during two sessions which he attended. In his book Psychomancy (1853), Page observed that the rapping sounds came from underneath the girls' long dresses.

When he asked if the spirits could produce a sound at a distance from their own bodies, one girl climbed into a wardrobe closet where her dress touched the wood, whence the sound transmitted into the wood plank — however, she was unable to control this sound sufficiently to produce spirit communications. Page devised contraptions that emulated the rapping sounds produced by the girls, which could be concealed under long clothing. He declaimed the girls' means of hiding from the bodily examination that would expose their fraud:

 The feminine security of these rappers against the inspection of their actual quomodo... if by search warrant, stratagem, or vi et armis, the rapping instrument of these Fox girls had been exposed to the public, there would not have been one doubt about the nature and origin of the spiritual communications.

In 1857, the Boston Courier set up a prize of $500 to any medium who could demonstrate a paranormal ability to their committee. The Fox sisters made an attempt and were investigated by a committee which included the magician John Wyman. The committee concluded the raps were produced by bone and feet movements and thus the Fox sisters failed the challenge.

A report by the Seybert Commission in 1887 stated that after investigating various mediums including Margaret; the phenomena could have easily been produced by fraudulent methods. The report noted that the raps were heard close to Margaret and a séance sitter, Professor Furness had felt pulsations in her foot.

Kate was one of mediums examined by William Crookes, the prominent physicist, between 1871 and 1874, who concluded the raps were genuine. However, Crookes was described as gullible and the mediums he investigated were caught using trickery.

In 1904, remains were found in the cellar when a false wall fell down. The Boston Journal published a story about the discovery, claiming that it was the body of the supposed peddler, on November 22, 1904. However, the police at the time didn't open an investigation, as a physician who examined the bones found that it consisted of random bits of bones, including chicken bones, and concluded they had been placed there as a practical joke. A few years later, a "peddler tin box" was claimed to have been found in the cellar along with the remains, although there is no mention of the box in earlier accounts of the finding.

The remains and the tin box are now in the Lily Dale Museum. Skeptical researcher Joe Nickell concluded after researching the box and the primary sources of the bones that they constituted further hoaxing. The bones were, at least in part, those of animals. There has been no confirmation that the peddler existed. The alleged false wall appears to be due to an expansion of the foundation, not concealment of a secret grave.

Confession and later lives 

Kate had traveled to England in 1871, the trip paid for by a wealthy New York banker, so that she would not be compelled to accept payment for her services as a medium. The trip was apparently considered missionary work, since Kate sat only for prominent persons, who would let their names be printed as witnesses to a séance. In 1872, Kate married H.D. Jencken, a London barrister, legal scholar, and enthusiastic Spiritualist. Jencken died in 1881, leaving Kate with two sons.

Over the years, sisters Kate and Margaretta had developed serious drinking problems. Around 1888, they became embroiled in a quarrel with their sister Leah and other leading Spiritualists, who were concerned that Kate was drinking too much to care properly for her children. At the same time, Margaretta, contemplating a return to the Roman Catholic faith, became convinced that her powers were diabolical.

Eager to harm Leah as much as possible, the two sisters traveled to New York City, where a reporter offered $1,500 if they would "expose" their methods and give him an exclusive on the story. Margaretta appeared publicly at the New York Academy of Music on October 21, 1888, with Kate present. Before an audience of 2,000, Margaret demonstrated how she could produce—at will—raps audible throughout the theater. Doctors from the audience came on stage to verify that the cracking of her toe joints was the source of the sound.

Margaretta told her story of the origins of the mysterious "rappings" in a signed confession given to the press and published in New York World, October 21, 1888. In it, she explained the Hydesville events.

She expanded on her career as a medium after leaving the homestead to begin her Spiritualist travels with her older sister, Mrs. Underhill:

 "Mrs. Underhill, my eldest sister, took Katie and me to Rochester. There it was that we discovered a new way to make the raps. My sister Katie was the first to observe that by swishing her fingers she could produce certain noises with her knuckles and joints and that the same effect could be made with the toes. Finding that we could make raps with our feet – first with one foot and then with both – we practiced until we could do this easily when the room was dark. Like most perplexing things when made clear, it is astonishing how easily it is done. The rapping is simply the result of perfect control of the muscles of the leg below the knee, which govern the tendons of the foot and allow the action of the toe and ankle bones that are not commonly known. Such perfect control is only possible when the child is taken at an early age and carefully and continually taught to practice the muscles, which grow stiffer in later years. ... This, then, is the simple explanation of the whole method of the knocks and raps."

She also wrote:

 "A great many people when they hear the rapping imagine at once that the spirits are touching them. It is a very common delusion. Some very wealthy people came to see me some years ago when I lived in Forty-second Street and I did some rappings for them. I made the spirit rap on the chair and one of the ladies cried out: "I feel the spirit tapping me on the shoulder." Of course, that was pure imagination."

Harry Houdini, the magician who devoted a large part of his life to debunking Spiritualist claims, provided this insight:

 "As to the delusion of sound. Sound waves are deflected just as light waves are reflected by the intervention of a proper medium and under certain conditions it is a difficult thing to locate their source. Stuart Cumberland told me that an interesting test to prove the inability of a blindfolded person to trace sound to its source. It is exceedingly simple; merely clicking two coins over the head of the blindfolded person."They both took strong stances against Spiritualism at the time:
 "That I have been chiefly instrumental in perpetrating the fraud of Spiritualism upon a too-confiding public, most of you doubtless know. The greatest sorrow in my life has been that this is true, and though it has come late in my day, I am now prepared to tell the truth, the whole truth, and nothing but the truth, so help me God! I am here tonight as one of the founders of Spiritualism to denounce it as an absolute falsehood from beginning to end, as the flimsiest of superstitions, the most wicked blasphemy known to the world." – Margaretta Fox Kane, quoted in A.B. Davenport, The Deathblow to Spiritualism, p. 76. (Also see New York World, for October 21, 1888 and New York Herald and New York Daily Tribune, for October 22, 1888.)

 "I regard Spiritualism as one of the greatest curses that the world has ever known." – Katie Fox Jencken, New York Herald, October 9, 1888.

Pressured by the Spiritualist movement and her own dire financial circumstances, Margaretta recanted her confession in writing in November 1889, about a year after her exhibition. She had attempted to return to Spiritualist performances, but never again attracted the attention or paying clientele of the sisters' earlier careers.

Kate died at her home, at 609 Columbus Avenue in New York City, on July 3, 1892. Less than a year later, Margaretta, deep in alcoholism, was living on charity as the sole tenant of an old tenement house at 456 West 56th Street. She was taken to the home of Spiritualist Mrs. Emily B. Ruggles, 492 State Street in Brooklyn, where she died on March 8, 1893.  All three sisters are interred in Brooklyn, New York: Margaretta and Catherine in Cypress Hills Cemetery, and Leah with the Fox family in Green-Wood Cemetery.

Legacy

Parapsychology
The Fox sisters have been widely cited in parapsychology and spiritualist literature. According to psychologists Leonard Zusne and Warren Jones, "many accounts of the Fox sisters leave out their confession of fraud and present the rappings as genuine manifestations of the spirit world." C. E. M. Hansel notes in 1989 that "remarkably, the Fox sisters are still discussed in the parapsychological literature without mention of their trickery."

In popular culture 

 The Fabulist Fox Sister (2020 musical), by Luke Bateman and Michael Conley.

References

Further reading 
 Chapin, David. (2004). Exploring Other Worlds: Margaret Fox, Elisha Kent Kane, and the Antebellum Culture of Curiosity. University of Massachusetts Press.
 Davenport, Reuben Briggs. (1888). The Death-Blow to Spiritualism: Being the true story of the Fox sisters, as revealed by the authority of Margaret Fox Kane and Catherine Fox Jencken. New York: G.W. Dillingham.
 Edinger, Ray. (2015). Love and Ice: The Tragic Obsessions of Dr. Elisha Kent Kane, Arctic Explorer. Savannah: Frederic C. Beil, Publisher.
 Hansel, C.E.M. (1989). The Search for Psychic Power. Prometheus Books. 
 Houdini, Harry. (2011, originally published in 1924). A Magician Among the Spirits. Cambridge University Press. 
 Mann, Walter. (1919). The Follies and Frauds of Spiritualism. Rationalist Association. London: Watts & Co.
 Natale, Simone (2016) Supernatural Entertainments: Victorian Spiritualism and the Rise of Modern Media Culture. University Park, PA: Pennsylvania State University Press. .
 Page, Charles Grafton. (1853).  Psychomancy: Spirit-Rappings and Table-Tippings Exposed. New-York: D. Appleton and Company.
 Stuart, Nancy Rubin. 2005. The Reluctant Spiritualist: The Life of Maggie Fox. New York, Harcourt.
 Wiseman, Richard. (2011). Paranormality: Why We See What Isn't There. Macmillan. 
 Vincent Medina. 2016 Supernatural Existence: The Rise and fall of the Fox Sisters

External links 
 The Fox Sisters: Communicating with the Beyond, Spiritualism and the Lily Dale Community by John H. Martin
 Boston Journal article from 1904 regarding the discovery of a body in the cellar of the Fox sisters' house.
 Photograph of Kate and Maggie Fox, New York, 1852. Thomas M. Easterly. From the Missouri History Museum.

19th-century occultists
American occultists
American spiritual mediums
Burials at Cypress Hills Cemetery
People from Rochester, New York
People from Wayne County, New York
Sibling trios